Raasamahan  is a 1994 Indian Tamil-language romantic drama film written and directed by Manivannan. The film stars Prashanth and Sivaranjani. The music was composed by Ilaiyaraaja. The film opened to mixed reviews from critics.

Cast
Prashanth as Prabhakaran
Sivaranjani as Selvi
Chandrasekhar as Chellachamy
Rekha as Chellachamy's wife
Vinu Chakravarthy as Chellachamy's father
Jai Ganesh as Prabhakaran's father
Srividya as Prabhakaran's mother
R. Sundarrajan as Appachi
Manivannan as Aandai
Halwa Vasu as Aandai's sidekick
Manobala as Broker (guest appearance)

Soundtrack

The film score and the soundtrack were composed by Ilaiyaraaja and lyrics were written by Vaali. The soundtrack, released in 1994, features 5 tracks. The song "Vaikasi Vellikilama" set in carnatic ragam known as Shree ranjani and "Kaathirunthen Thaniye" set in Mohanam. All the songs were hits.

References

Indian romantic drama films
1994 films
Films scored by Ilaiyaraaja
1990s Tamil-language films
Films directed by Manivannan
1994 romantic drama films